Waitākere City was a territorial authority in West Auckland, New Zealand; it was governed by the Waitākere City Council from 1989 to 2010. It was New Zealand's fifth-largest city, with an annual growth of about 2%. In 2010 the council was amalgamated with the other authorities of the Auckland Region to form the current Auckland Council.

The name "Waitākere" comes from the Waitākere River in the Waitākere Ranges.

History 
 

Waitakere City was formed by the amalgamation of Waitemata City with the boroughs of Henderson, New Lynn, and Glen Eden in the 1989 nationwide re-organisation of local government. There were just two mayors of Waitakere City during its existence, Assid Corban (previously mayor of Henderson Borough) from 1989 to 1992, and Bob Harvey from 1992 to 2010.

In February 1993 the council developed the "Greenprint" as an Agenda 21 initiative and declared itself to be an eco-city.

On 1 November 2010, the Waitakere City Council was abolished and Waitakere City was merged into a single Auckland city governed by Auckland Council. All council facilities, assets and services were handed over to the new council.

Administrative structure
The elected Council consisted of the mayor and 14 councillors representing the four wards. Each ward also had an elected community board that considered local issues.

Geography, wards and suburbs

Henderson Ward
This urban ward contained the old Henderson borough as well as the suburbs of Glendene, Te Atatū South, and Te Atatū Peninsula (formerly Te Atatū North). There were 40,086 residents in 2001. It was located immediately to the west of Auckland city, some 10 kilometres from the city centre, along the western shores of the Waitematā Harbour and its southwestern arm, the Whau River.

Massey Ward
Although this area was principally urban, it also had some farms and lifestyle blocks in the north and west. The ward contained the suburbs of Whenuapai, Hobsonville, West Harbour, Massey, Ranui, and Henderson North. It had a population of 51,369 in the 2001 census. It was located to the north of the Henderson Ward, along the Waitemata's northwestern shore, and included one of New Zealand's largest concentrations of former military bases, with former large army and air force stations within the ward.

New Lynn Ward
Centred on the old boroughs of New Lynn and Glen Eden, it also contained the suburbs of Kelston, Green Bay, Titirangi, Kaurilands, Waima, and Woodlands Park. The ward had a population of 49,845 in 2001. New Lynn Ward was to the south of Henderson Ward, and extended to the shore of the Manukau Harbour at its southern end. New Lynn itself is 10 kilometres southwest of Auckland city centre.

Waitakere Ward
This ward was by far the largest in area as it encompassed the sparsely populated Waitākere Ranges, as well as some of the urban fringes as the city expanded westward into former orchards and farms. The population of 27,450 in 2001 was the smallest of the wards, but it was also the fastest growing. It encompassed the suburbs, villages and localities of Swanson, Henderson Valley, Sunnyvale, Oratia, Waiatarua, Laingholm, Parau, Cornwallis, Huia, Whatipu, Karekare, Piha, Anawhata, Bethells / Te Henga, and Waitakere township. Many of these had volunteer fire brigades to protect their communities from the summer bush fires. This ward lay to the west of the three other wards, and extended to the north as well. Its northern end, around Muriwai, was the furthest part of Waitakere from Auckland city centre, lying some 30 kilometres to the northwest of it.

Industry
The two major commercial centres of Waitakere City were Henderson and New Lynn. Waitakere City's workforce was strongly oriented towards Auckland City, with about 40% of all workers living in the city commuting into the Auckland City area for work from the late 2000s.

Sister cities

  Huntington Beach, California, US
  Kakogawa, Japan
  Ningbo, China
  Galway, Ireland
  Amritsar, India

See also
List of regions in New Zealand
Territorial Authorities of New Zealand.

References

External links
 Waitakere Online

 
Territorial authorities of New Zealand
Populated places established in 1989
Populated places disestablished in 2010
History of Auckland
Former subdivisions of the Auckland Region
West Auckland, New Zealand